The 1921–22 season was Al-Mokhtalat SC's 11th season of football. The club won 1921–22 Egyptian Cup, 1921–22 Sultan Hussein Cup.

1922 Egypt Cup

1922 Sultan Cup

References

1921 in association football
1922 in association football
Zamalek SC seasons